Isiaih Latrell Mosley (born May 3, 2000) is an American college basketball player for the Missouri Tigers of the Southeastern Conference (SEC).

High school career
Mosley attended Rock Bridge High School in Columbia, Missouri. As a senior, he averaged 23.2 points and 6.9 rebounds per game, leading his team to the Class 5 state championship, its first-ever state title. He was named Mr. Show-Me Basketball as the top high school player in Missouri. Mosley competed for MOKAN Elite on the Amateur Athletic Union circuit. He committed to playing college basketball for Missouri State over offers from Bradley, Mississippi State, Missouri and SMU. He joined the team with his high school teammate Ja'Monta Black.

College career
On January 18, 2020, Mosley had a freshman season-high 23 points and eight rebounds in a 68–58 win over Evansville. As a freshman, he averaged 8.3 points and 3.6 rebounds per game. On January 3, 2021, Mosley scored 29 points, including 23 in the second half, in a 77–60 win over Indiana State. He became the first Missouri State player to score 20-plus points in five straight games since Johnny Murdock in 1995. In his next game, on January 9, Mosley recorded 29 points, eight rebounds and five assists in an 81–68 victory over Valparaiso. As a sophomore, he averaged 19.8 points, 6.3 rebounds and 3.1 assists per game. Mosley was named to the First Team All-Missouri Valley Conference as well as conference Most Improved Player. On January 8, 2022, he scored a career-high 43 points in a 85–84 loss to Northern Iowa. On January 22, Mosley scored 40 points in a 79–69 upset of Loyola–Chicago. He repeated on the First Team All-Missouri Valley Conference as a junior. For the season, Mosley averaged 20.4 points, 6.2 rebounds, and 2.3 assists per game. On April 6, 2022, he declared for the 2022 NBA draft while maintaining his college eligibility. He withdrew from the NBA draft on May 28, 2022, officially returning to college for his senior season. He visited Mississippi State, and also received interest from Kansas, Kansas State, and Texas Tech. On June 6, 2022, Mosley announced on his Instagram page that he had committed to transfer to Missouri, headlining the first recruiting class for new coach Dennis Gates.

Career statistics

College

|-
| style="text-align:left;"| 2019–20
| style="text-align:left;"| Missouri State
| 32 || 10 || 21.9 || .472 || .403 || .865 || 3.6 || 1.1 || .6 || .3 || 8.3
|-
| style="text-align:left;"| 2020–21
| style="text-align:left;"| Missouri State
| 24 || 24 || 33.7 || .505 || .386 || .847 || 6.3 || 3.1 || 1.0 || .1 || 19.8
|-
| style="text-align:left;"| 2021–22
| style="text-align:left;"| Missouri State
| 34 || 32 || 31.6 || .504 || .427 || .902 || 6.2 || 2.3 || 1.2 || .2 || 20.4
|- class="sortbottom"
| style="text-align:center;" colspan="2"| Career
| 90 || 66 || 28.7 || .498 || .410 || .874 || 5.3 || 2.1 || .9 || .2 || 15.9

References

External links
Missouri State Bears bio

2000 births
Living people
20th-century African-American sportspeople
21st-century African-American sportspeople
African-American basketball players
American men's basketball players
Basketball players from Missouri
People from Macon, Missouri
Missouri State Bears basketball players
Rock Bridge High School alumni
Shooting guards
Small forwards